"Let's Get Down" is a song recorded by American R&B group Tony! Toni! Toné! for their fourth studio album House of Music (1996). It was written by Raphael Saadiq, DJ Quik, and George Archie. The song was produced by Saadiq with DJ Quik and G-One. "Let's Get Down" was released as the lead single from House of Music and was sent to R&B and crossover radio on October 28, 1996.

Music and lyrics 
"Let's Get Down" features a gentle funk groove with a repeating acoustic guitar figure. The song has a party theme and silky vocals by Tony! Toni! Toné!, alternated by DJ Quik's streetwise rapping.

Track listings
US CD Single 
"Let's Get Down" (Without Rap) – 3:52
"It's a Beautiful Thing" – 4:35

UK CD Single 
"Let's Get Down" (Without Rap) – 3:52
"It's a Beautiful Thing" – 4:35
"Til Last Summer" – 5:11
"Let's Get Down" (featuring DJ Quik) – 3:52

UK Vinyl 12” Pressing 
"Let's Get Down" (Satoshi Tomiie Oil Shock Mix) – 9:00
"Let's Get Down" (X-Mix Radio Edit) – 4:03
"Let's Get Down" (Vission Lorimer Euphoria Mix) – 4:35
"Let's Get Down" (Satoshi Tomiie Dramatized Club Mix) – 8:30

Live performances
The group performed the song on the Late Show with David Letterman in 1996. MTV teen summit 1996

Charts

Weekly charts

Year-end charts

References

External links 
 "Rhythm Section" by Billboard

1996 singles
1996 songs
Tony! Toni! Toné! songs
DJ Quik songs
Mercury Records singles
Songs written by Raphael Saadiq
Song recordings produced by DJ Quik
Song recordings produced by G-One
Song recordings produced by Raphael Saadiq
Songs written by DJ Quik
Funk songs